"Hello Afrika" is a 1990 song recorded by Sweden-based musician and producer Dr Alban. It was released as the debut single from his first album with the same name (1990). It features Swedish Eurodance singer Leila K. The song is similar to Eddy Grant's "Hello Africa", but in the style of hip hop. It peaked at number one in Austria and achieved a great success in most of the other European countries, including Sweden, Germany and Switzerland.

Dr. Alban has stated that "Hello Afrika" took about two months to record. In the 2017 book Stars of 90's Dance Pop: 29 Hitmakers Discuss Their Careers by James Arena, he told about meeting Denniz PoP and of the making of the song, "We met through the DJ channels, as he was working as one at the same time I was. We just started working together on "Hello Afrika", and it all came together. We had a good chemistry, and we just thought, "Come on, let's go in the studio and see what we can do." It was hard to get the song initially released, but the thing is that other DJs (who we gave it to before we had a record deal) played the track and liked it. That built demand for it in the clubs, and then it started to hit radio. That later paved the way for our deal with [Logic and Ariola Records]."

It has been covered by South African group Dr Victor and the Rasta Rebels. It was covered by Grup Raptiye as "Hello Malatya" at the 1991 album, Doping, and by Grup Vitamin as "Hamiyet" at "Bol Vitamin" one in 1990 and "Deli Dolu Best Of 1" in 1996.

Critical reception
In his review of the Hello Afrika album, Larry Flick from Billboard commented, "Equally strong are the title track, a prideful tribal ode that features a nifty guest appearance by Leila K." A reviewer from Music & Media wrote, "Pounding, tribal drums dominate this poppy rap for African unity." The magazine also called it "an great African house track, hailing from Sweden." They added, "This mixture of African tribal rhythms, Jamaican toasting and western house technology is already very big in Scandinavian and German clubs. The rest of Europe will doubtlessly follow." British magazine Music Week described it as a "Prince Buster influenced tuggingly rolling ragga rap".

Music video
The accompanying music video for "Hello Afrika" was directed by Scottish director Paul Boyd. It received heavy rotation on MTV Europe. Boyd would also go on directing the video for Alban's next single, "No Coke".

Track listings
 7" single
 "Hello Afrika" (Marc Spoon's radio edit) — 3:46
 "Hello Afrika" (single mix) — 3:13

 CD single
 "Hello Afrika" (Marc Spoon's radio edit) — 3:46
 "Hello Afrika" (single mix) — 3:13

 CD maxi
 "Hello Afrika" (fast blast club mix) — 5:40
 "Hello Afrika" (aaahfrika mix) — 6:25
 "Jungle Beats" (gurana mix) — 4:28
 "Hello Afrika" (single mix) — 3:13

 CD maxi/12" maxi single - Remix
 "Hello Afrika" (tech-makossa-mix) — 7:42
 "Hello Afrika" (freedom for bleeb & bass mix) — 6:30
 "No Coke" (hip hop reggae in a dance hall style) — 4:40

Charts and certifications

Weekly charts

Year-end charts

Certifications

See also
List of number-one hits of 1991 (Austria)

References

1990 debut singles
1990 songs
Dr. Alban songs
English-language Swedish songs
Leila K songs
Music videos directed by Paul Boyd
Number-one singles in Austria
Reggae fusion songs
Song recordings produced by Denniz Pop
Songs written by Denniz Pop
Songs written by Dr. Alban
Songs written by Leila K